Daulat Khan (born 19 May 1957) is a former Pakistani professional squash player.

Daulat Khan was born in Peshawar and began playing squash in 1968 aged 11. He represented Pakistan in the 1977 & 1979 World Team Squash Championships.

References

External links
 

Pakistani male squash players
1957 births
Living people
Sportspeople from Peshawar
Racket sportspeople from Peshawar